HTC is the original design manufacturer for many Android and Windows Phone-based smartphones and PDAs. Brands that market or previously marketed HTC-manufactured products include Dell, Fujitsu Siemens, HP/Compaq, i-mate, Krome, O2, Palm, Sharp Corporation, and UTStarcom. HTC also manufactures ultra-mobile PCs, and is also the manufacturer of the Nexus One and Nexus 9, a smartphone and tablet designed and branded by Google, respectively.

Android devices

Smartphones 

HTC 10 evo (also known as bolt) needs to be added to the above figure reference is here: https://www.htc.com/us/smartphones/htc-bolt/buy/

Tablets

7 Series (Windows Phone 7)

8 Series (Windows Phone 8)

Brew MP phones

S Series (Windows Mobile)

T Series (Windows Mobile with Touch)

P Series (PDA phones)

X Series (Mobile computer, Subnote)

Contracted devices 

These devices were created under contract for a single non-carrier manufacturer and not branded by HTC, any carriers, or any other manufacturer. For this reason, none of them feature any custom HTC UI.

See also 
 HTC Vive
 O2 Xda

References

External links 
 HTC homepage
Htc Mobile Phones
 List of HTC phones running Android by Google

HTC phones

Lists of mobile phones
Lists of mobile computers
Computing comparisons